Atebubu-Amantin Municipal District is one of the eleven districts in Bono East Region, Ghana. Originally it was formerly part of the then-larger Atebubu District on 10 March 1989, until the northern part of the district was split off to create Pru District on 12 November 2003 (effectively 18 February 2004); thus the remaining part has been renamed as Atebubu-Amantin District,  which it was later elevated to municipal district assembly status on 15 March 2018 to become Atebubu-Amantin Municipal District. The municipality is located in the east central part of Bono East Region and has Atebubu as its capital town.

District Substructure 
As of 2018, the district comprises eight (8) zonal councils. These were: Atebubu, Amantin, New Konkrompe, Jato Zongo, Akokoa, Nyomoase, Kumfia/Fakwasi and Garadima.

Population 
According to the 2010 population and housing census of Ghana the population of the Atebubu-Amantin District was 105,938. 50.7% of the population was of male and females made up 49.3% of the population. Majority of the population reside in the two principal towns of Atebubu and Amantin.

List of settlements

Amantin, Jato Zongo, Kumfia, Fakwasi, Abamba

Sources
 
 District: Atebubu-Amantin Municipal District
 19 New Districts Created, November 20, 2003.

References

Districts of Bono East Region
States and territories established in 2003
Populated places in the Bono East Region